Nextera is a pioneering independent Czech record label, founded in Prague in 1989, notable for discovering some of the most enduring artists in dance, ambient and electronic music. It was founded by Kristian Kotarac.

Artists 
 Clock DVA
 The Hafler Trio
 Colin Potter
 Lustmord
 Ohm Square
 Oöphoi
 Peter Namlok
 Steve Roach
 Klaus Wiese
 Sylvain Chauveau

See also
 List of record labels

External links
 Official site

Czech independent record labels
Record labels established in 1989
Electronic music record labels
Ambient music record labels
Electronic dance music record labels
1989 establishments in Czechoslovakia